William G. Fisk (November 5, 1916 – March 28, 2007) was an American football end and defensive end who played in the National Football League (NFL) and All-America Football Conference (AAFC) from 1940 to 1948.  ].

Early years
Born in Los Angeles, California, Fisk prepped at Alhambra High School and played college football at the University of Southern California (USC). He was a member of the Trojans' 1938 Rose Bowl-winning team, and was voted Most Inspirational Player on the 1939 USC Trojans football team, which own a national championship. He was one of six Trojans selected for the 1940 College All-Star Game in Chicago.

Professional football career
Fisk played for the NFL's Detroit Lions and the AAFC's San Francisco 49ers and Los Angeles Dons between 1940 and 1948. He was drafted in the third round of the 1940 NFL Draft by Detroit.

Later years
Fisk was an assistant coach of the USC Trojans between 1949 and 1956 under head coaches Jeff Cravath and Jess Hill. After coaching, Fisk worked in aerospace. His son Bill, Jr. was an offensive guard on USC's 1962 national championship team, and was named All-American in 1964.   He served as head coach of Mt. San Antonio College for a period of time.

References

External links

 ESPN obituary
 

1916 births
2007 deaths
American football defensive ends
American football ends
Detroit Lions players
Los Angeles Dons players
San Francisco 49ers (AAFC) players
USC Trojans football players
USC Trojans football coaches
Mt. SAC Mounties football coaches
Players of American football from Los Angeles
Sports coaches from Los Angeles
San Francisco 49ers players